The Montgomery, Alabama Metropolitan Statistical Area (commonly known as the Tri-Counties or the River Region) is a metropolitan area in central Alabama. As of 2020, the MSA had a population of 386,047, ranking it 142nd among United States Metropolitan Statistical Areas. That number is up +3.07% from the 2010 census number of 374,536. In September of 2018 the OMB formed the Montgomery-Selma-Alexander City CSA. It's made up of the 4 county Montgomery MSA and the Selma, AL (Dallas County) and Alexander City, AL (Coosa and Tallapoosa County) micropolitan areas. The 7 county CSA has a population of 522,873 as of the 2020 census.
Autauga
Elmore
Lowndes
Montgomery

Communities

Places with more than 200,000 inhabitants
Montgomery (Principal city)

Places with 10,000 to 35,000 inhabitants
Millbrook
Prattville

Places with 1,000 to 10,000 inhabitants
Blue Ridge (census-designated place)
Coosada
Eclectic
Fort Deposit
Hayneville
Mosses
Tallassee (partial)
Wetumpka
White Hall
Pike Road

Places with fewer than 1,000 inhabitants
Autaugaville
Benton
Billingsley
Deatsville
Elmore
Gordonville
Lowndesboro

Unincorporated places
Booth
Equality (part of Equality is in Elmore County) 
Letohatchee 
Davenport

Demographics
As of the census of 2000, there were 346,528 people, 129,717 households, and 90,298 families residing within the MSA. The racial makeup of the MSA was 57.32% White, 40.27% African American, 0.31% Native American, 0.77% Asian, 0.03% Pacific Islander, 0.37% from other races, and 0.94% from two or more races. Hispanic or Latino of any race were 1.20% of the population.

The median income for a household in the MSA was $35,567, and the median income for a family was $42,304. Males had a median income of $31,881 versus $22,995 for females. The per capita income for the MSA was $16,996.

Combined Statistical Area
The former Montgomery–Alexander City Combined Statistical Area (CSA) was made up of six counties in central Alabama. The statistical area included the Montgomery Metropolitan Statistical area and the former Alexander City Micropolitan Statistical Area, composed of Coosa and Tallapoosa Counties. As of the 2000 Census, the CSA had a population of 400,205 (though a July 1, 2009 estimate placed the population at 417,965).

In 2013, the United States Office of Management and Budget removed the Alexander City Micropolitan Statistical Area and Montgomery-Alexander City Combined Statistical Area from the list of metropolitan areas.
Coosa County then became part of the Talladega-Sylacauga Micropolitan Statistical Area.

Politics

For the first half of the 20th century, the Montgomery metropolitan area leaned towards the Democratic Party, as did the rest of the Solid South. It was one of the first regions in Alabama to flip towards the Republican Party, narrowly voting for Richard Nixon in 1960. With the one exception of George Wallace's third-party win in 1968, the Montgomery MSA would continue voting for Republicans, by varying margins, until Barack Obama's narrow victory there in 2012. No candidate has won the MSA by more than 3 percentage points in the most recent three presidential elections.

Transportation
 Interstate 65
 Interstate 85
 U.S. Highway 31
 U.S. Highway 80
 U.S. Highway 82
 U.S. Highway 231
 U.S. Highway 331

See also
Table of United States Metropolitan Statistical Areas
Table of United States Combined Statistical Areas
Alabama census statistical areas

References

External links
The River Region Online

 
Geography of Montgomery County, Alabama
Geography of Elmore County, Alabama
Geography of Autauga County, Alabama
Geography of Lowndes County, Alabama
Geography of Montgomery, Alabama